Anne Dufourmantelle (20 March 1964 – 21 July 2017) was a French philosopher and psychoanalyst.

Education and career
Dufourmantelle was educated at Brown University and at Paris-Sorbonne University, where she earned a doctorate in philosophy in 1994. She practised psychoanalysis and was a professor at the European Graduate School and a contributor to the French daily newspaper Libération.

Her philosophical work focused on risk taking, which she argued was essential, saying that "absolute security - like 'zero risk' - is a fantasy" and that "[R]eal danger must be faced in order to survive". Her book Éloge du risque or Praise of Risk was published in 2011. Dufourmantelle was also a professor of psychoanalysis at The European Graduate School.

Death
She died on July 21, 2017, at Pampelonne beach in Ramatuelle near the city of Saint-Tropez, while trying to rescue two children caught in the Mediterranean when the water became dangerously turbulent. The children were rescued by lifeguards and survived, but Dufourmantelle could not be resuscitated.

Honours
Dufourmantelle won the Prix Raymond de Boyer de Sainte-Suzanne from the Académie française in 1998.

Works
 De l'hospitalité, with Jacques Derrida, Paris, Calmann-Lévy, 1997  
 La Vocation prophétique de la philosophie, Éditions du Cerf, 1998
 La Sauvagerie maternelle, Paris, Calmann-Lévy, 2001, édition poche 2016 
 Le Livre de Jonas, with Marc-Alain Ouaknin, Bayard, 2001
 Parcours : entretiens avec Anne Dufourmantelle, with Miguel Benasayag, Paris, Amazon Media, 2001
 Une question d'enfant, Paris, Bayard, 2002  
 Blind Date : sexe et philosophie, Paris, Calmann-Lévy, 2003  
 Du retour : abécédaire biopolitique, A.Pandolfi, 2003
 Negri on Negri : in conversation, Taylor & Francis, 2004  
 Procès Dutroux : penser l'émotion, Paris, ministère de la Communauté française, 2004
 American Philo, with Avital Ronell, Paris, éditions Stock, 2006   
 La Femme et le Sacrifice : d'Antigone à la femme d'à côté, Paris, Denoël, 2007  
 Fighting theory, with Avital Ronell, Université de l'Illinois Press, 2010  
 Éloge du risque, Paris, Payot, 2011  
 Dieu, l'amour et la psychanalyse, with Jean-Pierre Winter, Paris, Bayard Jeunesse, 2011  
 Intelligence du rêve, Paris, Payot, 2012  
 En cas d'amour : psychopathologie de la vie amoureuse, Paris, Rivages, 2012 ;
 Puissance de la douceur, Paris, Payot, 2013  
 Se trouver, with Laure Leter, Paris, Jean-Claude Lattès, 2014 
 L'Envers du feu, Paris, éditions Albin Michel, 2015 
 Défense du secret, Éditions Payot, 2015

References

1964 births
2017 deaths
French women philosophers
French psychoanalysts
Deaths by drowning in France
21st-century French writers
21st-century French women writers
Writers from Paris